Mahatma Gandhi Chitrakoot Gramodaya Vishwavidyalaya (MGCGV), formerly Chitrakoot Gramodaya Vishwavidhayalay and Mahatma Gandhi Gramodaya Vishwavidyalaya, is a first rural state university located at Chitrakoot, Madhya Pradesh, India. It was established in 1991.

History
The university was established in 1991 by Nanaji Deshmukh as Chitrakoot Gramodaya Vishwavidhayalay under The Chitrakoot Gramodaya Vishwavidhayalay Adhiniyam, 1991. The name was changed to Mahatma Gandhi Gramodaya Vishwavidyalaya in 1995 through The Chitrakoot Gramodaya Vishwavidyalaya (Sanshodhan) Adhiniyam, 1995, naming the university after Mahatma Gandhi. Finally, it received its current name in 1997 under The Mahatma Gandhi Gramodaya Vishwavidyalaya (Sanshodhan) Adhiniyam, 1997 which restored the name Chitrakoot to the title of the university.

Faculties and departments
The university is divided into five faculties and 16 departments:

 Faculty of Agriculture
Department of Crop Sciences
 Department of Natural Resource Management
Department of Technology Transfer
 Faculty of Arts
 Department of People's Education and Mass Communication
 Department of Professional Arts
 Department of Humanities Social Sciences
 Department of Sanskrit
 Faculty of Rural Development and Business Management
Department of Rural Development
 Department of Business Management
 Faculty of Science and Environment
Department of Physical Science
Department of Biological Science
 Department of Energy and Environment
 Faculty of Engineering and Technology
Department of Food Technology
Department of Agriculture Engineering
Department of Information Technology
 Department of Civil Engineering

References

External links
 

Universities and colleges in Madhya Pradesh
1991 establishments in Madhya Pradesh
Educational institutions established in 1991